Kostarevo is a rural locality (a selo) in Silantyevsky Selsoviet, Birsky District, Bashkortostan, Russia. The population was 210 as of 2010. There are 6 streets.

Geography 
Kostarevo is located 18 km southwest of Birsk (the district's administrative centre) by road. Kamyshinka is the nearest rural locality.

References 

Rural localities in Birsky District